The 2014 FIA World Rally Championship-3 was the second season of the World Rally Championship-3, an auto racing championship recognised by the Fédération Internationale de l'Automobile, running in support of the World Rally Championship. It was created when the Group R class of rally car was introduced in 2013.

Sébastien Chardonnet started as the defending champion. However, he did not defend his title as he competed in the WRC-2 championship instead.

The championship was won by Stéphane Lefebvre. Alastair Fisher finished the championship second with Martin Koči third.

Calendar
Unlike its predecessor – the Production Car World Rally Championship – the World Rally Championship-3 did not have a fixed calendar. Instead, teams and drivers competing in the series were free to contest any of thirteen rallies that formed the 2014 World Rally Championship. They had to nominate up to six events to score points in, and their best five results from these six events counted towards their final championship points score. The World Rally Championship was open to two-wheel drive cars complying with R1, R2 and R3 regulations.

Teams and drivers

Rally summaries

Notes
  — The Monte Carlo Rally was shortened when a competitor stopped on Stage 14, blocking traffic and forcing organisers to abandon the stage.

Standings

FIA World Rally Championship-3 for Drivers

FIA World Rally Championship-3 for Co-Drivers

FIA World Rally Championship-3 for Teams

Regulation changes
 All competitors registered in the Championships–WRC, WRC-2, WRC-3 and the Junior WRC—were obliged to use a colour-coded windscreen sticker to distinguish its category.
 Drivers were no longer assigned permanent numbers, except upon request.
 All competitors registered for the Junior WRC were registered for scoring points in the World Rally Championship-3.

References

External links
Official website of the World Rally Championship
Official website of the Fédération Internationale de l'Automobile

 
World Rally Championship 3